John Alexander Barfield (3 March 1909 - 16 January 1974) was an American country and old-time music performer, best known for his 1939 recording of "Boogie Woogie", the first country boogie.

He was born in Tifton, Georgia, and in his youth played guitar on street corners with his brother Coot. They recorded for Columbia Records in Atlanta in 1927, but the recordings were not released.  Soon afterwards, Johnny Barfield became acquainted with Clayton McMichen and Bert Layne of the Skillet Lickers, touring with the group and recording with some of its offshoots, including McMichen's group, the Georgia Wildcats.  By 1932 he was performing both solo, and as a member of Layne's band.  In 1939, he won a recording contract with Bluebird Records, and released his version of "Boogie Woogie", a song derived from "Pinetop's Boogie Woogie" recorded in 1928 by Pinetop Smith.  Barfield's song is considered the first country boogie, and became popular on jukeboxes.

Barfield recorded again in 1940 and 1941, but failed to repeat his earlier success.  He continued to perform for several years.  He died in 1974, aged 64.

References

1909 births
1974 deaths
American country singer-songwriters
People from Tifton, Georgia
20th-century American singers
Country musicians from Georgia (U.S. state)
Singer-songwriters from Georgia (U.S. state)